Combined Insurance is a global provider of supplemental insurance, including accident insurance, life insurance and critical care coverage. Combined Insurance operates in North America, Latin America, Europe and the Pacific. The company is headquartered in Chicago, Illinois.

History 

In 1922, W. Clement Stone, with a borrowed $100, started Combined Registry Company in Chicago.

During the difficulty of the Great Depression, Stone in 1929 cut his field force to just 135 agents – from more than 1,000 agents – to increase efficiency. In 1939, after weathering the Depression, Stone created the Combined Mutual Casualty Company, which was established when Combined Registry Company purchased the American Casualty Company in Texas. In 1947 the company changed its name to Combined Insurance Company of America.

In 1956, Combined Insurance expanded to cover Canada.

Between 1959 and 1963 the company expanded into Australia, then Puerto Rico and the Bahamas, then into Europe with the addition of England and Northern Ireland. In 1962 Stone authored the self-help book The Success System That Never Fails.

In 1971, the Combined Life Insurance Company of New York was established.

In 1980, shareholders of Combined Insurance Company of America approved the formation of a holding company, Combined International Corporation, which traded publicly on the New York Stock Exchange under the call letters PMA (standing for "Positive Mental Attitude", a Stone catchphrase). Two years later the company merged with Ryan Insurance Group, with Stone becoming Chairman of the new company and Patrick Ryan becoming President and CEO. The new company was renamed Aon – a Gaelic word signifying oneness and unity – in 1987.

Stone stepped down from day-to-day operations in the early 1990s and took the title Chairman Emeritus.

In 2008, Aon sold Combined Insurance to ACE Limited for $2.56 billion which resulted in the closure of the UK employee benefits arm.

Business

Combined Insurance offers several types of insurance policies – which vary by market and customer need – including accident, accident and sickness, critical care, cancer, life and Medicare supplement coverage.

Combined Insurance also includes Combined Insurance Worksite Solutions, which offers supplemental insurance to complement existing employer benefits programs and Combined Insurance Select Programs, which provides niche insurance products including student accident and health insurance, employer group vision insurance and other group accident and health products.

Notes

Financial services companies established in 1922
Companies based in Cook County, Illinois
Insurance companies of Canada
Insurance companies of Australia
Insurance companies of Ireland
Insurance companies of Portugal
Insurance companies of Spain
Insurance companies of the United Kingdom
Insurance companies of New Zealand
Insurance companies of Puerto Rico
Insurance companies of the Bahamas